Chayan (also Romanized as Chāyān) is a village in Simineh Rud Rural District, in the Central District of Bahar County, Hamadan Province, Iran. At the 2006 census, its population was estimated at 145, in 75 families.

References 

Populated places in Bahar County